French is an anglicised version of Defreine, which has a Norman origin. Although the name is of French origin, it does not mean "French"; rather, it comes from the French word for ash tree.

French is or was the surname of the following individuals (alphabetized by first name):
 Adrienne French (born 1987), fine art photographer
 Alexander French (born 1980), Hong Kong cricketer
 Alice Masak French (1930–2013), Canadian Inuit writer
 Anne French (born 1956), New Zealand poet
 Annie French (1873–1965), Scottish artist
 Anthony French (born 1920), English professor of physics at Massachusetts Institute of Technology
 Arthur W. French (1846-1916), American journalist and songwriter, and composer
 Bob French (jazz musician) (contemporary), American drummer
 Brett French (contemporary), Australian rugby league footballer
 Bruce French (actor) (born 1945), an American actor
 Bruce French (cricketer) (born 1959), English cricketer
 Callie Leach French (1861-1935), American steamboat captain
 Charles K. French (1860–1952), American actor
 Charlie French (1883–1962), American baseball player
 Christine French (1968-to present), Mother of Cameron Casner, IT consultant and Sales, former wife of Jason Casner
 Christopher French (theologian), Irish theologian
 Christopher French (judge) (1925–2003), British barrister and judge
 Daniel French (inventor) (1770–1853), American inventor and steamboat pioneer
 Daniel Chester French (1850–1931), American sculptor
 David H. French (anthropologist) (1918–1994), American anthropologist and linguist; expert on Native Americans
 David French (playwright) (born 1939), Canadian playwright best known for Leaving Home (1971) and other plays about the Mercer family
 Dawn French (born 1957), Welsh-English actress, writer, and comedy performer
 Domingo French (1774–1825), Argentine leader of the May Revolution and War of Independence
 Drew French (born 1984), American baseball coach
 Edward French (bishop), bishop of Elphin from 1787 to 1810
 Elizabeth French (contemporary), English archaeologist
 Emma Lee French (1836–1897), English immigrant to the Southwestern United States who became known as a caregiver
 Freddie French (1911–1989), New Zealand rugby union and professional rugby league footballer
 Frederick Fillmore French (1883–1936), American real estate entrepreneur
 Gary French (contemporary), Australian rugby league footballer
 George Arthur French (1841–1921), Canadian law enforcement officer
 Harriet Schneider French (1824–1906), American physician and temperance movement activist
 Heather French (born 1974), American beauty pageant winner
 Henry F. French (1813–1885), American agriculturist, inventor, lawyer, and public servant
 Hollis French (born 1958), member of the Alaska Senate
 Ian French (born 1960), Australian rugby league footballer
 Jackie French (born 29 November 1953), Australian author
 James French (murderer) (1936–1966), American criminal; became sole prisoner executed in 1966
 James Bruce French (1921–2002), Canadian-American nuclear physicists
 James R. French (contemporary), American aerospace engineer
 Jay Jay French (born 1952),  American guitarist
 Jennifer French (disambiguation), multiple people
 Jim French (cowboy) (before 1865–after 1879), an American frontier figure who became known as an outlaw
 Jim French (photographer) (born 1932), American artist and photographer of homoerotica who has used the pseudonym Rip Colt
 Jim French (baseball) (born 1941), American catcher active during the 1960s and 1970s
 Jim French (radio) (contemporary), American voice actor and producer
 Joe French (footballer), English footballer with Southampton and New Brompton in the 1890s/1900s
 John French (physician) (1616–1657), English doctor and chemist
 John R. French (1819–1890), American publisher, editor, and political figure
 John French, 1st Earl of Ypres (1852–1925), English military leader, commander of the British Expeditionary Force in World War I
 John French, 2nd Earl of Ypres (1881–1958), English army officer and artist; son of 1st Earl
 John William French (1888–1970), Canadian political figure
 John Alexander French (1914–1942), Australian soldier; posthumous recipient of Victoria Cross for valor in World War II
 John French (racing driver) (born 1930), Australian champion racer of the 1960s, 1970s, and early 1980s
 Joe French (born 1948), British air chief marshal, Royal Air Force commander
 John French (musician) (born 1949), American drummer
 John French (ice hockey) (born 1950), Canadian ice hockey player
 Joseph Lewis French (1858–1936), American novelist, editor, and poet
 Joseph Nathaniel French (1888–1975), architect
 Kate French (born 1984), American actress
 Katy French (1983–2007), Irish socialite and model
 Kenneth French (born 1954), American economist 
 Kristen French (1976–1992), the Canadian murder victim
Lisa Ann French (1964–1973),  American murder victim
 Lorna French, British playwright
 Lucy Virginia French (1825-1881; pen name, "L'Inconnue"), American author
 Marilyn French (born 1929), American author
 Mary Billings French, American heiress
 Melinda Ann French (born 1964), American philanthropist ex-wife of Bill Gates; best known as Melinda Gates
 Michael French (born 1962), English actor best known for his television roles as David Wicks on EastEnders and Nick Jordan on Casualty and Holby City
 Micky French (born 1955), English footballer
 Nicki French (born 1964), English singer
 Patrick French (bishop), bishop of Elphin from 1731 to 1748
 Pete French, singer in the hard rock bands Leaf Hound, Atomic Rooster and Cactus
 Percy French (1854–1920), Irish songwriter, performer, and painter
 Peter French (1849–1897), cattle baron in Oregon
 Peter French (Dominican) (died 1693), Irish theologian
 Ray French (baseball) (1895–1978), American Major League shortstop of the 1920s; later Minor League manager and umpire
 Ray H. French (1919–2000), American artist and printmaker
 Ray French (contemporary), English rugby radio commentator and former player
 Robert French (born 1947), Chief Justice of the High Court of Australia
 Rufus French (born 1978), American football player
 Samuel French (1821–1898), an American entrepreneur and theatrical publisher
 Samuel Gibbs French (1818–1910), American Army officer who served as Confederate major general during Civil War
 Sarah French, an American beauty contest winner who subsequently became a television news reporter
 Seán French (1890-1937), Irish Fianna Fáil political figure who served in Dáil and as Lord Mayor of Cork (1924–29 and 1932–37)
 Seán French (1931–2011), Irish Fianna Fáil political figure who served in Dáil and as Lord Mayor of Cork (1976–77)
 Sid French (1920–1979), British communist 
 Susan French (1912–2003), American television, film, and stage actress
 Tana French (born 1973), Irish novelist and theatrical actress
 Valerie French (actress) (1928–1990), English-American performer who played leads in six 1956–57 films
 Valerie French (born 1962), American wrestling personality best known under the ring name, Sunshine (wrestling)
 Victor French (1934–1989), American actor best known for playing in support of Michael Landon on the television series Highway to Heaven
 Walter French (baseball) (1899–1984), American outfielder for Philadelphia Athletics who played in 1929 World Series
 Walter French (cricket umpire) (before 1905–1961), an Australian cricket figure who umpired 1931 Test matches
 Warren French (born 1963), founder of the Victorian Geocaching Club
 Wesley French (born 1996), American football player
 William H. French (1815–1881), American Union Army general in Civil War

See also
 Joseph French, a detective who appears in several novels by Irish-English author Freeman Wills Crofts (1879–1957)
 Giles French, English butler "Mr. French", portrayed by actor Sebastian Cabot on the 1966–71 television series of America, Family Affair
 Paul French, a pseudonym used by American author Isaac Asimov (1920–1992) for his juvenile book series Lucky Starr 
 Nicci French, pseudonym of a married duo of British journalists and authors, Nicci Gerrard and Sean French
 Jim French (horse) (1968–1992), American thoroughbred racehorse
 Ffrench or ffrench, variant spellings of the surname
 Baron de Freyne (1786–)

English-language surnames
Surnames of Norman origin